Class Trip is a 1998 French drama film by Claude Miller, based on the 1995 novel of the same name by Emmanuel Carrère. Its original French title is La Classe de neige, which is the name given to class trips in the snow. It tells the story of a young boy on a school skiing trip who suffers anxiety attacks that bring on disturbing nightmares.

Synopsis
The story begins with Nicolas at ten years old and dreading the school ski trip. Nicolas was worried that he wouldn't fit in with the other boys. His overprotective father decides to take Nicolas by himself instead of going with the group. En route, Nicolas and his father pass the aftermath of an apparently fatal car accident. Seeing police ahead while the traffic had stopped, Nicolas' father becomes nervous and conceals all loose items within the car in the trunk – and we see that Nicolas' travel bag is next to several matching briefcases. Nicolas subsequently forgets his bag in his father's car, increasing his awkwardness.

He is befriended by Hodkann, another pupil. One of Nicolas main fears is wetting his bed, and the situation gets worse when he gets a bed just above Hodkann. At night Nicolas tries to stay awake but falls asleep, waking up from a wet dream but believing he has wet his pants. He leaves his bed to clean his clothes and while returning he discovers it snowing outside. Nicolas goes outside into the freezing cold and ends up locked out, and in desperation curls up inside the car of his ski instructor, Patrick. Before he drifts off to sleep he sees a van driving away. He is found in the morning by Patrick and is taken in to a study with a fever.

Later that day he goes to a café while the other boys are skiing. While in the café, police come looking for René, a young boy who is missing. That night while sleeping he has a nightmare. He dreams that he is at a theme park with Hodkann and Patrick and that he goes on a giant caterpillar while his little brother is looked after by another seemingly friendly man. Once he is on the caterpillar he sees his brother being walked to a white van by the stranger. Later he is found outside the park after having one of his organs taken. The dream is poignant because Nicolas, months before, had not been allowed to go on a similar ride because it would have meant leaving one of the brothers with a stranger. After declining the stranger's offer to watch the brother, Nicolas' father warns against stranger danger, claiming this includes a risk of organ theft. At the end of the story Nicolas finds that his father was not in an accident as he had day dreamed, but rather that his father was a "monster" and possibly abused children. (Although it is never explained why the father has been arrested).

The movie ends with Nicolas being driven to his mother's home by Patrick, with the fate of his father and the friendship between Nicolas and Hodkann left to the viewers imagination.

Cast
 Clément van den Bergh as Nicolas
 Lokman Nalcakan as Hodkann
 François Roy as The Father
 Yves Verhoeven as Patrick

Music
"Laguna Veneta" • "Jeudi" • "Indians" • "Samedi soir" • "Don't but ivory anymore" • "Dimanche soir" • "Laguna laita" • "Lundi".
Composer - Henri Texier

"Mashala".
Composer - Bojan Zulfikarpasic

"La Salsa du demon".
"King Kong five".
Petite messe solennelle (Rossini).
"So tell the girls that I'm back in town" - Jay Jay Johansson.

Awards
The film was entered into the 1998 Cannes Film Festival where it won the Jury Prize.

References

External links 
 

1998 films
1990s French-language films
1998 drama films
Films directed by Claude Miller
Skiing films
French drama films
1990s French films